John Nixon is the name of:

Politicians
John Nixon (MP), Member of the Long Parliament in England, representing Oxford City 1646-1648
John T. Nixon (1820–1889), U.S. Representative from New Jersey
John William Nixon (1880–1949), Unionist politician in Northern Ireland

Military figures
John Nixon (Continental Army general) (1727–1815), Continental Army general from Massachusetts during the American Revolution
John Nixon (financier) (1733–1808), Philadelphia merchant and militia officer during the American Revolution
John Nixon (Indian Army officer) (1857–1921), lieutenant general in the British Indian Army

Others
 John Nixon, Armagh, Irish Republican, see 1981 Irish hunger strike#1980 hunger strike
 John Nixon, Australian artist, director of Institute of Modern Art 1980–82
John Nixon (mining engineer) (1815–1899), English mining engineer
John B. Nixon (1928–2005), murderer in Mississippi, USA
John E. Nixon, director of Michigan state Budget office
John Colley Nixon (died 1818), English merchant and amateur artist
John Trice Nixon (born 1933), U.S. federal judge